Icon is a compilation album from the American southern rock band Lynyrd Skynyrd. It was released on August 31, 2010. The album was certified Gold on November 12, 2015 by the RIAA.

Album Information
Lynyrd Skynyrd's Icon collection was released as a part of the Icon album series released by Universal Music Enterprises (UMe), a collection of compilation albums "from 30 major artists spanning rock, pop, R&B and country."

Icon comes in a standard one-disc edition, as well as a two-disc edition titled Icon 2 which features an additional live track and rarities in addition to other singles from the band.

Track listing
"Sweet Home Alabama" (Ed King, Gary Rossington, Ronnie Van Zant) - 4:45
"I Ain't the One" (Rossington, Van Zant) - 3:54
"Tuesday's Gone" (Allen Collins, Van Zant) - 7:33
"Gimme Three Steps" (Collins, Van Zant) - 4:30
"Simple Man" (Rossington, Van Zant) - 5:58
"Call Me the Breeze" (J.J. Cale) - 5:09
"You Got That Right" (Steve Gaines, Van Zant) - 3:47
"That Smell" (Collins, Van Zant) - 5:48
"Swamp Music" (King, Van Zant) - 3:33
"Saturday Night Special" (King, Van Zant) - 5:10
"What's Your Name?" (Rossington, Van Zant) - 3:33
"Free Bird" (Live) (Collins, Van Zant) - 13:48

Tracks 1, 6, and 9 from Second Helping (1974)
Tracks 2-5 from (Pronounced 'Lĕh-'nérd 'Skin-'nérd) (1973)
Tracks 7-8 and 11 from Street Survivors (1977)
Track 10 from Nuthin' Fancy (1975)
Track 12 from One More from the Road (1976) and recorded live on 7/8/1976 at the Fox Theatre in Atlanta, Georgia

Icon 2 Track Listing

Disc 1
"Sweet Home Alabama" (King, Rossington, Van Zant) - 4:45
"Comin' Home" (Original version) (Collins, Van Zant) - 5:30
"I Ain't the One" (Rossington, Van Zant) - 3:54
"Mr. Banker" (Rossington, King, Van Zant) - 5:21
"Tuesday's Gone" (Collins, Van Zant) - 7:33
"Gimme Three Steps" (Collins, Van Zant) - 4:30
"The Ballad of Curtis Loew" (Collins, Van Zant) - 4:52
"Simple Man" (Rossington, Van Zant) - 5:58
"Swamp Music" (King, Van Zant) - 3:33
"Was I Right or Wrong?" (Rossington, Van Zant) - 5:25
"Workin' for MCA" (King, Van Zant) - 4:47
"Free Bird" (Collins, Van Zant) - 9:10

Disc 2
"Call Me the Breeze" (Cale) - 5:08
"Saturday Night Special" (King, Van Zant) - 5:09
"Double Trouble" (Collins, Van Zant) - 2:50
"All I Can Do Is Write About It" (Acoustic version) (Collins, Van Zant) - 4:24
"Gimme Back My Bullets" (Rossington, Van Zant) - 3:29
"Four Walls of Raiford" (Undubbed demo) (Jeff Carlisi, Van Zant) - 4:14
"Whiskey Rock-A-Roller" (Live) (King, Billy Powell, Van Zant) - 4:16
"That Smell" (Collins, Van Zant) - 5:48
"I Know a Little" (Gaines) - 3:28
"You Got That Right" (Gaines, Van Zant) - 3:47
"What's Your Name?" (Rossington, Van Zant) - 3:33
"Free Bird" (Live) (Collins, Van Zant) - 13:48

Disc 1, Tracks 1, 7, 9, and 11 and Disc 2, Track 1 from Second Helping
Disc 1, Track 2 from The Essential Lynyrd Skynyrd (1998)
Disc 1, Tracks 3, 5-6, 8, and 12 from (Pronounced 'Lĕh-'nérd 'Skin-'nérd)
Disc 1, Track 4 from Legend (1987)
Disc 1, Track 10 from Skynyrd's First and... Last (1978)
Disc 2, Track 2 from Nuthin' Fancy
Disc 2, Tracks 3 and 5 from Gimme Back My Bullets (1976)
Disc 2, Tracks 4 and 6 from the Lynyrd Skynyrd Box Set (1991)
Disc 2, Tracks 7 and 12 from One More from the Road
Disc 2, Tracks 8-11 from Street Survivors

Live songs
Disc 2, Track 7 recorded live on 7/7/1976 at the Fox Theatre in Atlanta, Georgia
Disc 2, Track 12 recorded live on 7/8/1976 at the Fox Theatre in Atlanta, Georgia

Certifications

References

Lynyrd Skynyrd compilation albums
2010 compilation albums
Geffen Records compilation albums